Tyn-y-Gongl or Ty'n-y-gongl is a village and post town, just west of the town of Benllech and east of Brynteg, on the island of Anglesey, north Wales.

Villages in Anglesey
Llanfair-Mathafarn-Eithaf